The 2018/19 FIS Ski Jumping Alpen Cup was the 29th Alpen Cup season in ski jumping for men and the 11th for ladies.

Other competitive circuits this season included the World Cup, Grand Prix, Continental Cup, FIS Cup and FIS Race.

Calendar

Men

Ladies

Standings

Men

Ladies

Ladies' Alpen Cup Tournament

References 

2018 in ski jumping
2019 in ski jumping
FIS Ski Jumping Alpen Cup